Elidon Demiri (born 13 May 1979, in Fier) is an Albanian football coach and former player, who most recently was manager of Apolonia Fier in the Albanian Superliga.

Managerial career
He succeeded Ernest Gjoka as manager of Apolonia in November 2012.

References

1979 births
Living people
Sportspeople from Fier
Association football defenders
Albanian footballers
KF Apolonia Fier players
KF Bylis Ballsh players
KF Teuta Durrës players
Besa Kavajë players
KF Skënderbeu Korçë players
Bilisht Sport players
Albanian football managers
KF Apolonia Fier managers